Shanghai Dong Hai Plaza is a skyscraper in Shanghai, China. The tower was completed in 2004 after a long period on hold, construction having started in 1994.

See also
 List of tallest buildings in Shanghai

External links
 
 

SOHO China
Buildings and structures completed in 2004
Skyscrapers in Shanghai
Skyscraper office buildings in China
Retail buildings in China